Reynaldo is a Spanish given name from the German name Reinhold. Notable people with the name include:

 Reynaldo Aguado Montealegre (born 1960), Nicaraguan activist
 Reynaldo Aimonetti (born 1943), Argentine footballer
 Reynaldo Anderson (born 1986), Panamanian footballer
 Reynaldo Bignone (1928-2018), former Argentinian president
 Reynaldo Brown (born 1950), American track and field athlete
 Reynaldo Clavasquín (born 1972), Honduran footballer
 Reynaldo Dagsa (1975–2011), Filipino politician
 Reynaldo Dante (1912–1985), Filipino actor
 Reynaldo Díaz (born 1991), Mexican footballer
 Reynaldo G. Evangelista (born 1960), Filipino Roman Catholic bishop
 Reynaldo Garcia (born 1974), Dominican baseball pitcher
 Reynaldo Gianecchini (born 1972), Brazilian actor
 Reynaldo González López (1948–2015), Cuban sportsperson and former member of the International Olympic Committee
 Reynaldo Antonio Hernández (born 1984), Salvadoran footballer 
 Reynaldo Hahn (1874–1947), Venezuelan-born French musician
 Reynaldo Hill (born 1982), American football player
 Reynaldo López (born 1994), Dominican baseball pitcher
 Reynaldo (footballer, born 1997), Brazilian footballer
 Reynaldo Parks (born 1974), Costa Rican footballer
 Reynaldo Patiño, Salvadoran swimmer
 Reynaldo Pineda (born 1978), Honduran footballer
 Reynaldo (footballer, born 1989), Brazilian footballer
 Reynaldo Rodríguez (born 1986), Colombian baseball player
 Reynaldo Sietecase (born 1961), Argentine journalist
 Reynaldo Tilguath (born 1979), Honduran footballer
 Reynaldo Young (born 1966), Uruguayan musician

See also